"Broken English" is a song recorded by English singer Marianne Faithfull for her seventh studio album Broken English (1979). It was released as the second single from the album on 25 January 1980 by Island Records. Written by Faithfull, Barry Reynolds, Joe Mavety, Steve York and Terry Stannard, the song's lyrical theme revolves around terrorism. The inspiration behind the song was Ulrike Meinhof, a co-founder of the terrorist group Baader-Meinhof Gang. Faithfull allegedly got the idea for the song after watching a documentary about the group and was intrigued by its subtitle "broken English... spoken English".

Musically, "Broken English" is a mid-tempo rock song with a strong influence of new wave music. It is built around a simple rhythm guitar beat with synthesizer sound effects. It shows Faithfull's vocals cracked and lower in pitch compared to her earlier work as a result of severe laryngitis coupled with heavy smoking and drug abuse during the 1970s. "Broken English" received positive reviews from music critics who praised Faithfull's new musical direction as well as the political theme of the song. Despite the positive reception, it failed to chart in both United Kingdom and the United States. However, it managed to peak inside the top forty in other countries, such as Germany, New Zealand and Sweden.

No accompanying music video was filmed for "Broken English", although it was used along with the songs "Witches' Song" and "The Ballad of Lucy Jordan" in a promotional short film for the album directed by Derek Jarman. Faithfull performed the song on Saturday Night Live in February 1980. During the infamous performance her voice cracked and she seemingly strained to even vocalize at times. The song was featured in the film The Outsider (1980) and was covered by a number of artists, such as Winston Tong, English band Sunscreem, The Mars Volta, and Japanese group Schaft.

Composition 

"Broken English" is a rock song with a strong influence of new wave music. The song is set in the simple time signature of 4/4, with a tempo of 122 beats per minute.

Critical reception 
"Broken English" received positive reviews from music critics. Dave Thompson from AllMusic praised Faithfull's vocals but criticized the electronic production of the song. Pitchfork included the song on their "The 200 Best Songs of the 1970s" list at #200, calling it a "prophetic merging of punk and dance, with lyrics that plumb the depths of her losses" with "a bloodless snarl that would make Johnny Rotten flinch.".

Live performances 
Faithfull performed the song on Saturday Night Live in February 1980.

Track listings and formats 

UK 12" vinyl
A. "Broken English" (Long Version) – 5:54
B. "Why'd Ya Do It" – 6:35

UK 7" vinyl
A. "Broken English"
B. "What's the Hurry"

US 7" vinyl
A. "Broken English" (Edit) – 3:00
B. "Brain Drain" – 4:12

European 12" vinyl (1982 re-release)
A. "Broken English" (Long Version)
B. "Sister Morphine"

Credits and personnel 
 Marianne Faithfull – lead vocals, songwriting
 Mark Miller Mundy – producer, 
 Barry Reynolds – songwriting
 Joe Mavety – songwriting
 Steve York – songwriting
 Terry Stannard – songwriting
 Bob Potter – engineer
 Ed Thacker – mixer

Credits adapted from the album liner notes.

Charts

Cover versions
A version by English dance music group Sunscreem was released in late 1992 and reached No. 13 on the UK Singles Chart in January 1993, from their debut album O3. The song was also covered by the industrial band Schaft on the album Switchblade. This version would be used as an insert song for Hellsing Ultimates trailer at Anime Expo 2005 and then used in the actual series for the 5th episode.

Notes

References 

1979 songs
1980 singles
Marianne Faithfull songs
British new wave songs
1992 singles
Sunscreem songs
Island Records singles
S2 Records singles